Mathien is a Midwestern funk rock band named after lead singer and guitarist Chris Mathien. Chris started his Band at Southern Illinois University with Saxophonist Brendan Greenstreet, Drummer Jermaine Ballinger, Bassist Jason Jones, Trombonist Nick Williams. Mathien wrote, produced, and played all the parts on his first album Head, Heart & Hands (2007). To form a new live band Chris met with bassist Mike Schiff and drummer Aaron Bouslog and formed the group in Carbondale, Illinois, at Southern Illinois University. They would later be joined by keyboardist George Jackson after relocating to Chicago, Illinois. Lee England Jr. on violin was also added as a guest for the recording of the album Hello, Again (2009). The band played a packed House of Blues in Chicago to kick off the album and tour. With songs like "Little Richard", "Dirt That I Do","Goodbye", "Remember" and "We Don't Need to Make Love, to Know That We've Got it" the band had built a strong fan base and played shows on a 2009–2010 tour. 2011 brought some changes with the band for the recording of "The Night I was an Alpha Male" (2011). George Jackson was out and Peter Wilkins joined the band on keyboards. They kicked off with an album release party at House of Blues again and toured in the Midwest. The band also broke into college radio playlists across the country; radio support came from North Central College WONC-FM in Naperville IL and Findlay College WLFC-FM in Findley, Ohio, and many others. The title track received heavy air play plus songs like "Jamie's Son", "Betaman", "Rub It In", "The Hold" and the huge crowd favorite "Lettuce Head". 2012 the band changed drummers and welcomed Omar Jahwar to the band, Mathien began a midwest tour during 2012 building a fan base at every show they played. Later that year Chris Mathien was on WONC-FM's Local Chaos radio show and said the band will be recording a new album for release in 2013.

2013 was a new era for the band. Members have changed for a new album that had its release party and concert at the House of Blues in Chicago in May 2013. The album Darling Television was released on May 3, 2013, with critical acclaim on mp3, CD and limited run of pink vinyl. The HOB show also kicked off a summer tour for the band which took them to many new cities and fans.  Some of the lead songs are "Dames on the Train", "Don't Leave the Light On", "Raw Doggin' Fool" and "Joy". They all were getting played on college radio stations like WONC-FM Naperville IL & WLFC-FM Findlay OH.

After touring the Midwest and southern states through the fall of 2013, the band has taken a break to look forward to 2014. Chris Mathien has been writing songs for new recordings and getting back to his roots.

The summer of 2014 brought big changes to the Mathien band. The band performed a gig at the Metro in Chicago and a video is filmed for a new song "You've Made a Stone Outta Me". This will be the last performance for the band "for now" as Chris Mathien has moved to Knoxville-Nashville TN area. During June he released a new album on his own as he chose not to re-sign with Midwest Music Group. Chris has disbanded the band and is performing mostly solo shows in the Nashville club circuit. In June 2014 he released a new album "Unique Man" that can be downloaded on Bandcamp, iTunes and other sites.

January 20, 2015 Chris Mathien released a new album via Spotify, iTunes, Bandcamp and his website. The album The Freedom Tapes first single and video is "Wurlitzer Crowley". Chris is performing live in support of the album in the midwest and will play in London in April 2015.

Discography

Band members
Chris Mathien

References

Rock music groups from Illinois
American funk musical groups
Funk rock musical groups
Musical groups from Chicago
Musical groups with year of establishment missing